Bellfountain may refer to:
Bellfountain, Indiana
Bellfountain, Oregon

See also
Bellefontaine (disambiguation)